Ball is a hamlet on the outskirts of Wadebridge in north Cornwall, England, United Kingdom.

References

Hamlets in Cornwall